The Count of Bracial is a noble title, created by decree on 21 December 1882, by King Luís I of Portugal, in favor of Jacinto Pais de Matos Falcão.

List of counts
 Jacinto Pais de Matos Falcão, 1st Count of Bracial
 António Pais Champalimaud de Matos Moreira Falcão, 2nd Count of Bracial
 António Manuel Patrício Aboim Sales, 3rd Count of Bracial

References

Bracial
1882 establishments in Portugal